Pyrrhosoma elisabethae, the Greek red damselfly, is a species of damselfly in the family Coenagrionidae. The damselfly finds its habitat in rivers. It is found in Albania and Greece. It is threatened by habitat loss.

References

Coenagrionidae
Insects described in 1948
Taxonomy articles created by Polbot